Grand, (Grand/Milwaukee in station announcements) is an 'L' station on the CTA's Blue Line, at Grand Avenue, Halsted Street and Milwaukee Avenue in the southeast corner of the West Town neighborhood. It is also located within the Fulton River District.

History
Grand opened in 1951 as part of the Milwaukee-Dearborn Subway. The Milwaukee-Dearborn Subway was the second subway line in Chicago's Loop since the State Street Subway opened 8 years earlier in 1943.

Closure and reopening
Starting in 1982, Grand was closed during night and weekend hours as a cost savings measure due to low ridership. By 1992, the station was only serving 850 passengers a day, and, as a result, the CTA closed the station on February 9, 1992, due to its low ridership and a budget crisis. While the station was closed, the five stairways to the subway platform became garbage-strewn, and the station fell into disrepair. On April 21, 1999, the CTA decided to reopen Grand due to population growth in the area around the station.  After some refurbishment, Grand reopened on June 25, 1999, at 6:00 a.m.

Bus connections
CTA
 8 Halsted
 56 Milwaukee
 65 Grand

References

External links
Grand/Milwaukee Station Page
Grand Avenue entrance from Google Maps Street View

CTA Blue Line stations
Railway stations in the United States opened in 1951